Dhing College, established in 1965, is a general degree college situated in Dhing, Assam. This college is affiliated with the Gauhati University.

Departments

Science
Physics
Mathematics
Chemistry
Botany
Zoology

Arts and Commerce
Assamese
Bengali
English
History
Education
Economics
Philosophy
Political Science
Geography
Commerce

References

External links
http://www.dhingcollege.in/index.php

Universities and colleges in Assam
Colleges affiliated to Gauhati University
Educational institutions established in 1965
1965 establishments in Assam